Braised rice is a Ghanaian style of cooking rice. It is known as angwa moo in the Akan language, literally "oil rice" or omɔ kɛ fɔ(omor ker for) in the Ga language. It is prepared with few ingredients. and is usually balanced with some vegetables and any other accompaniment to balance the diet. The braised rice is served with ground pepper or shito, and served with Fried eggs, omelette or sardine.

Ingredients 
Rice
Cooking oil or Sunflower oil
Chopped onions
Eggs
Chopped tomatoes
Pepper
salt to taste
Water
Salted beef or Tolo beef or salted tilapia optional
A tin of sardine, optional
Sausage
Spaghetti
Carrot

See also 
 Ghanaian cuisine

References

External links 
 Video: Angwamu/Ghana oil rice recipe 
 Video: How to make famous Ghana oil rice

Rice dishes
Ghanaian cuisine